The women's recurve archery individual competition at the 2017 World Games took place from 23 to 25 July 2017 at the Szczytnicki Park in Wrocław, Poland.

Results

Ranking round

Competition bracket

Group A

Group B

Finals

References 

Women's individual recurve
World Games